The Romanians in Bulgaria ( or ; , rumŭntsi, or , vlasi), are a Romanian ethnic minority in Bulgaria. In the country, Romanians live in several northern regions, mostly along the Danube. This includes a region between the city of Vidin and the Timok river; these Romanians form a continuous community with the Romanian community in the Timok Valley of Serbia. Another region with a high density of Romanians is located between the towns of Oryahovo and Svishtov. Another goes from Tutrakan to the Bulgaria–Romania border at Northern Dobruja. There also are scattered groups of Romanians within the interior of Bulgaria, such as in Pleven or around Vratsa. The Romanians in Bulgaria are not recognized as a national minority, and they lack minority rights such as schools or churches in their own Romanian language. Many are subject to assimilation.

In Bulgaria, indigenous Romanians are commonly referred to as "Vlachs". This term is also applied to the Aromanians of the country, as well as to Romanian-speaking Boyash Gypsies.

The Romanians of Bulgaria have several organizations of their own, one of them being the AVE Union of Romanian Ethnicities of Bulgaria, presided by Ivo Gheorghiev, which often organizes cultural events. One example are celebrations for the Romanian Language Day organized in Vidin by this organization.

The following are historical census results showing the presence of Romanians in Bulgaria:

Out of 3,598 self-identified Vlachs, 165 declared their mother tongue as Bulgarian, 1,462 as Vlach, 1,964 as Romanian and 4 as "other" in 2011.
Out of 866 self-identified Romanians, 37 declared their mother tongue as Bulgarian, 3 as Vlach, and 822 as Romanian in 2011.

See also

 Bulgaria–Romania relations
 Bulgarisation
 Bulgarians in Romania
 Population exchange between Bulgaria and Romania

Notes

References

 
 
Bulgaria
Ethnic groups in Bulgaria
Bulgaria